Balcar is a surname. Notable people with the surname include:

 Bohuslav Balcar (1943–2017), Czech mathematician
 Jindřich Balcar (1950–2013), Czechoslovak ski jumper
 Karel Balcar (born 1966), Czech painter

Czech-language surnames